Fax is a British educational show, which included viewers sending in question, which aired on BBC1 from 7 January 1986 to 24 April 1988.  The series was presented by Bill Oddie, Wendy Leavesley, Debbie Rix and Billy Butler.

Transmissions

The third series of Fax was moved to a Sunday teatime slot when the Australian soap Neighbours was moved to the early evening on weekdays.

References

1986 British television series debuts
1988 British television series endings
BBC television documentaries
English-language television shows